The Steaua Stadium, informally also known as Ghencea, is a multi-purpose stadium in Bucharest, Romania. It primarily serves as the home stadium of CSA Steaua București and the Romania National Football Team replacing the former venue.  

The new stadium cost €95 million and is located in the neighbourhood of Ghencea. It seats 31,254 spectators.

Notable events
The stadium was inaugurated on 7 July 2021, with a match between Steaua and OFK Beograd, the same team with whom they had inaugurated the previous stadium back in 1974. It ended with a 6-0 win for the home team, with Bogdan Chipirliu being the first player to score in the new stadium.

Austria and North Macedonia's squads were based at the stadium during preparation for and between matches at UEFA Euro 2020.

Photo Gallery

See also 
List of football stadiums in Romania
List of European stadia by capacity

References
   

 
CSA Steaua București
Football venues in Romania  
Buildings and structures in Bucharest 
Sports venues in Bucharest
Sports venues completed in 2021
2021 establishments in Romania
21st century in Bucharest